Air Chief Marshal G Donald Perera VSV, USP is a Sri Lanka air officer who served as commander of the Air Force from 2002 to 2006 and Chief of the Defence Staff from 2006 to 2009. He served as Sri Lankan Ambassador to Israel.

Early life and education
Perera was educated at S. Thomas' College, Mount Lavinia.

SLAF career
Perera joined the Sri Lanka Air Force as an officer cadet in the general duties pilot branch in the officer cadet intake 1 of the Air Force Academy, China Bay on 12 January 1972. On completing his flying training he was commissioned as a pilot officer on 19 October 1973. Serving as a squadron pilot in the No. 2 Squadron SLAF, he logged over 7,500 flying hours on transports. He served as the Commandant Flying Training Wing, Air Force Academy, China Bay; Commanding officer, the No. 2 Squadron; Base Commander, SLAF Katunayake and Zonal Commander - Western Zone; Base Commander, SLAF China Bay and Zonal Commander - Eastern Zone and Acting Director Operations. He attended the Air Command and Staff College in 1990 and the National Defence College, New Delhi in 1998. He was appointed Chief of Staff of the SLAF in December 1998. On 16 July 2002, he was appointed commander of the Air Force with promotion to the rank of Air Marshal. He was appointed Chief of the Defence Staff on 12 June 2006 with promotion to the rank of Air Chief Marshal, during the final stages of the Sri Lankan Civil War and retired on 15 July 2009. His awards include Vishista Seva Vibhushanaya, Uttama Seva Padakkama, Republic of Sri Lanka Armed Services Medal, Sri Lanka Air Force 50th Anniversary Medal, Sri Lanka Armed Services Long Service Medal, President's Inauguration Medal, 50th Independence Anniversary Commemoration Medal, North and East Operations Medal, Purna Bhumi Padakkama, Vadamarachchi Operation Medal and Riviresa Campaign Services Medal.

Later work
Following is retirement as Chief of the Defence Staff, Perera was appointed Sri Lanka's Ambassador to Israel.

See also 
Sri Lankan Non Career Diplomats

References

External links
Air Chief Marshal G D Perera 
Air Chief Marshal G D Perera,  the new Chief of Defence Staff (CDS)

|-

|-

Year of birth missing (living people)
Commanders of the Sri Lanka Air Force
Sri Lankan Air Chief Marshals
Sinhalese military personnel
Sri Lankan aviators
Living people
Ambassadors of Sri Lanka to Israel
Alumni of S. Thomas' College, Mount Lavinia
Sri Lanka Air Force Academy graduates
Air Command and Staff College alumni
National Defence College, India alumni